Dwight Marcy (June 8, 1840 – May 7, 1887) was an American politician.

Marcy, son of Calvin and Elvira (Clark) Marcy, was born, June 8, 1840, in Union, Tolland County, Connecticut.  After graduation from Yale College in 1863, he studied law in Hartford, Conn., in the office of Waldo & Hyde, and was admitted to the bar in 1865.  He then began practice in Plainfield, Conn., but on his appointment as State's Attorney for Tolland County, in June, 1867, he removed his office to Rockville, in the township of Vernon, where he continued until his death.  In May, 1867, he was chosen Assistant Clerk of the Connecticut House of Representatives and served as Clerk of the same body the following year, and as Clerk of the Connecticut Senate in 1869. In 1878, 1879, and 1880, he was elected to represent the town of Vernon in the House; he was an influential member of the Assembly in the first and second years of his service, and was elected as Speaker at the remaining session. At the time of his death he was the recognized leader of the bar in Tolland County.  After suffering from Bright's disease for a long time, he died suddenly at his home, May 7, 1887, at the age of 47.

He married Alline S. Williams of Groton, Mass on June 1, 1867.

External links

1840 births
1887 deaths
People from Union, Connecticut
Yale College alumni
Connecticut lawyers
Members of the Connecticut House of Representatives
Speakers of the Connecticut House of Representatives
19th-century American politicians
People from Rockville, Connecticut
19th-century American lawyers